The 1987–88 All-Ireland Senior Club Football Championship was the 18th staging of the All-Ireland Senior Club Football Championship since its establishment by the Gaelic Athletic Association in 1970-71.

St. Finbarr's were the defending champions, however, they failed to qualify after being beaten by Muskerry in the second round of the 1987 Cork County Championship.

On 17 March 1988, St. Mary's Burren won the championship following a 1-09 to 0-08 defeat of Clann na nGael in the All-Ireland final at Croke Park. It was their second championship title overall and their first title since 1986.

Results

Munster Senior Club Football Championship

First round

Semi-finals

Final

All-Ireland Senior Club Football Championship

Quarter-final

Semi-finals

Final

Championship statistics

Miscellaneous

 Clann na nGael became the first team to win four successive Connacht Club Championship titles.
 Portlaoise became the first team to win five Leinster Club Championship titles.
 St. Mary's Burren became the first team to win four Ulster Club Championship titles.

References

1987 in Gaelic football
1988 in Gaelic football